Menesia bipunctata is a species of beetle in the family Cerambycidae. It was described by Zoubkov in 1829, originally under the genus Saperda. It has a wide distribution in Europe and Asia. It feeds on Juglans regia and Frangula alnus.

Varietas
 Menesia bipunctata var. quadripustulata Mulsant, 1863
 Menesia bipunctata var. perrisi Mulsant, 1856

References

Menesia
Beetles described in 1829